Argentina competed at the 1984 Summer Olympics in Los Angeles, United States, after having boycotted the 1980 Summer Olympics. 81 competitors, 71 men and 10 women, took part in 70 events in 14 sports.

Athletics 

Men

Women

Key

 DNF – Did not finish

Boxing

Key

 RSC – Referee stopped contest

Canoeing

Cycling

Road

Track

Sprints

Pursuits

Points races

Time trial

Key

 DNF – Did not finish
 DNQ – Did not qualify
 OVT – Overtaken

Diving

Equestrian

Show jumping
Individual

Team

Fencing

Men

Women

Judo

Rowing

Sailing

Key
 YMP – Yacht materially prejudiced
 DSQ – Disqualified

Shooting

Swimming

Key

DSQ – Disqualified

Volleyball

Roster

Group play

|}

5th to 8th place classification

5th place match

Wrestling

See also
Argentina at the 1983 Pan American Games

References

External links
 Official Report

Nations at the 1984 Summer Olympics
1984
1984 in Argentine sport